The English language was introduced to the Americas by British colonisation, beginning in the late 16th and early 17th centuries. The language also spread to numerous other parts of the world as a result of British trade and colonisation and the spread of the former British Empire, which, by 1921, included 470–570 million people, about a quarter of the world's population. Written forms of British and American English as found in newspapers and textbooks vary little in their essential features, with only occasional noticeable differences.

Over the past 400 years, the forms of the language used in the Americas—especially in the United States—and that used in the United Kingdom have diverged in a few minor ways, leading to the versions now often referred to as American English and British English. Differences between the two include pronunciation, grammar, vocabulary (lexis), spelling, punctuation, idioms, and formatting of dates and numbers. However, the differences in written and most spoken grammar structure tend to be much fewer than in other aspects of the language in terms of mutual intelligibility. A few words have completely different meanings in the two versions or are even unknown or not used in one of the versions. One particular contribution towards formalising these differences came from Noah Webster, who wrote the first American dictionary (published 1828) with the intention of showing that people in the United States spoke a different dialect from those spoken in the UK, much like a regional accent.

This divergence between American English and British English has provided opportunities for humorous comment: e.g. in fiction George Bernard Shaw says that the United States and United Kingdom are "two countries divided by a common language"; and Oscar Wilde says that "We have really everything in common with America nowadays, except, of course, the language" (The Canterville Ghost, 1888). Henry Sweet incorrectly predicted in 1877 that within a century American English, Australian English and British English would be mutually unintelligible (A Handbook of Phonetics). Perhaps increased worldwide communication through radio, television, the Internet and globalisation has tended to reduce regional variation. This can lead to some variations becoming extinct (for instance the wireless being progressively superseded by the radio) or the acceptance of wide variations as "perfectly good English" everywhere.

Although spoken American and British English are generally mutually intelligible, there are occasional differences which might cause embarrassment—for example, in American English a rubber is usually interpreted as a condom rather than an eraser; and a British fanny refers to the female pubic area, while the American fanny refers to a butt or ass (US) or an arse (UK).

Word derivation and compounds
 Directional suffix -ward(s): British forwards, towards, rightwards, etc.; American forward, toward, rightward. In both varieties distribution varies somewhat: afterwards, towards, and backwards are not unusual in America; while in the United Kingdom upward and rightward are the more common options, as is forward, which is standard in phrasal verbs such as look forward to. The forms with -s may be used as adverbs (or preposition towards) but rarely as adjectives: in the UK, as in America, one says "an upward motion". The Oxford English Dictionary in 1897 suggested a semantic distinction for adverbs, with -wards having a more definite directional sense than -ward; subsequent authorities such as Fowler have disputed this contention.
 American English (AmE) freely adds the suffix -s to day, night, evening, weekend, Monday, etc. to form adverbs denoting repeated or customary action: I used to stay out evenings; the library is closed on Saturdays. This usage has its roots in Old English but many of these constructions are now regarded as American (for example, the OED labels nights "now chiefly N. Amer. colloq." in constructions such as to sleep nights, but to work nights is standard in British English).
 In British English (BrE), the agentive -er suffix is commonly attached to football to refer to one who plays the sport (also cricket; often netball; occasionally basketball and volleyball). AmE usually uses football player. Where the sport's name is usable as a verb, the suffixation is standard in both varieties: for example, golfer, bowler (in ten-pin bowling and in lawn bowls), and shooter. AmE appears sometimes to use the BrE form in baller as slang for a basketball player, as in the video game NBA Ballers. However, this is derived from slang use of to ball as a verb meaning to play basketball.
 English writers everywhere occasionally make new compound words from common phrases; for example, health care is now being replaced by healthcare on both sides of the Atlantic. However, AmE has made certain words in this fashion that are still treated as phrases in BrE.
 In compound nouns of the form <verb><noun>, sometimes AmE prefers the bare infinitive where BrE favours the gerund. Examples include (AmE first): jump rope/skipping rope; racecar/racing car; rowboat/rowing boat; sailboat/sailing boat; file cabinet/filing cabinet; dial tone/dialling tone; drainboard/draining board. 
 Generally AmE has a tendency to drop inflectional suffixes, thus preferring clipped forms: compare cookbook v. cookery book; Smith, age 40 v. Smith, aged 40; skim milk v. skimmed milk; dollhouse v. dolls' house; barber shop v. barber's shop.
 Singular attributives in one country may be plural in the other, and vice versa. For example, the UK has a drugs problem, while the United States has a drug problem (although the singular usage is also commonly heard in the UK); Americans read the sports section of a newspaper; the British are more likely to read the sport section. However, BrE maths is singular, just as AmE math is: both are abbreviations of mathematics.
 Some British English words come from French roots, while American English finds its words from other places, e.g.  AmE eggplant and zucchini are aubergine and courgette in BrE.
 Similarly, American English has occasionally replaced more traditional English words with their Spanish counterparts. This is especially common in regions historically affected by Spanish settlement (such as the American Southwest and Florida) as well as other areas that have since experienced strong Hispanic migration (such as urban centers). Examples of these include grocery markets' preference in the U.S. for Spanish names such as cilantro and manzanilla over coriander and camomile respectively.

Vocabulary

The familiarity of speakers with words and phrases from different regions varies, and the difficulty of discerning an unfamiliar definition also depends on the context and the term. As expressions spread with the globalisation of telecommunication, they are often but not always recognised as foreign to the speaker's dialect, and words from other dialects may carry connotations with regard to register, social status, origin, and intelligence.

Words and phrases with different meanings 

Words such as bill  and biscuit are used regularly in both AmE and BrE but can mean different things in each form.  The word "bill" has several meanings, most of which are shared between AmE and BrE. However, in AmE "bill" often refers to a piece of paper money (as in a "dollar bill") which in BrE is more commonly referred to as a note. In AmE it can also refer to the visor of a cap, though this is by no means common. In AmE a biscuit (from the French "twice baked" as in biscotto) is a soft bready product that is known in BrE as a scone or a specifically hard, sweet biscuit. Meanwhile, a BrE biscuit incorporates both dessert biscuits and AmE cookies (from the Dutch 'little cake').

As chronicled by Winston Churchill, the opposite meanings of the verb to table created a misunderstanding during a meeting of the Allied forces; in BrE to table an item on an agenda means to open it up for discussion whereas in AmE, it means to remove it from discussion, or at times, to suspend or delay discussion; e.g. Let's table that topic for later.

The word "football" in BrE refers to association football, also known as soccer. In AmE, "football" means American football. The standard AmE term "soccer", a contraction of "association (football)", is actually of British origin, derived from the formalisation of different codes of football in the 19th century, and was a fairly unremarkable usage (possibly marked for class) in BrE until relatively recently; it has lately become perceived as an Americanism. In non-American and non-Canadian contexts, particularly in sports news from outside the United States and Canada, American (or US branches of foreign) news agencies and media organisations also use "football" to mean "soccer", especially in direct quotes.

Similarly, the word "hockey" in BrE refers to field hockey and in AmE, "hockey" means ice hockey.

Words with completely different meanings are relatively few; most of the time there are either (1) words with one or more shared meanings and one or more meanings unique to one variety (for example, bathroom and toilet) or (2) words the meanings of which are actually common to both BrE and AmE but that show differences in frequency, connotation or denotation (for example, smart, clever, mad).

Some differences in usage and meaning can cause confusion or embarrassment. For example, the word fanny is a slang word for vulva in BrE but means buttocks in AmE—the AmE phrase fanny pack is bum bag in BrE. In AmE the word pissed means being annoyed whereas in BrE it is a coarse word for being drunk (in both varieties, pissed off means irritated).

Similarly, in AmE the word pants is the common word for the BrE trousers and knickers refers to a variety of half-length trousers (though most AmE users would use the term "shorts" rather than knickers), while the majority of BrE speakers would understand pants to mean underpants and knickers to mean female underpants.

Sometimes the confusion is more subtle. In AmE the word quite used as a qualifier is generally a reinforcement, though it is somewhat uncommon in actual colloquial American use today and carries an air of formality: for example, "I'm quite hungry" is a very polite way to say "I'm very hungry". In BrE quite (which is much more common in conversation) may have this meaning, as in "quite right" or "quite mad", but it more commonly means "somewhat", so that in BrE "I'm quite hungry" can mean "I'm somewhat hungry". This divergence of use can lead to misunderstanding.

Different terms in different dialects

Most speakers of American English are aware of some uniquely British terms. It is generally very easy to guess what some words, such as BrE "driving licence", mean, the AmE equivalent being "driver's license". However, use of many other British words such as naff (slang but commonly used to mean "not very good") are unheard of in American English.

Speakers of BrE usually find it easy to understand most common AmE terms, such as "sidewalk (pavement or footpath)", "gas (gasoline/petrol)", "counterclockwise (anticlockwise)" or "elevator (lift)", thanks in large part to considerable exposure to American popular culture and literature. Terms heard less often, especially when rare or absent in American popular culture, such as "copacetic (very satisfactory)", are unlikely to be understood by most BrE speakers.

Other examples:
 In the UK the word whilst is commonly used as a conjunction (as an alternative to while, especially prevalent in some dialects). Whilst tends to appear in non-temporal senses, as when used to point out a contrast. In AmE while is used in both contexts, with whilst being much more uncommon. Other conjunctions with the -st ending are also found even in AmE as much as in BrE, despite being old-fashioned or an affectation (e.g., unbeknownst). 
 In the UK generally the use of fall to mean "autumn" is obsolete. Although found often from Elizabethan literature to Victorian literature, the seasonal use of fall remains easily understandable to BrE speakers only because it is so commonly used that way in the U.S.
In the UK the term period for a full stop is not used; in AmE the term full stop is rarely, if ever, used for the punctuation mark and commonly not understood whatsoever. For example, British Prime Minister Tony Blair said, "Terrorism is wrong, full stop", whereas in AmE, the equivalent sentence is "Terrorism is wrong, period." The use of period as an interjection meaning "and nothing else; end of discussion" is beginning to be used in colloquial British English, though sometimes without conscious reference to punctuation.
 In the US, the word line is used to refer to a line of people, vehicles, or other objects, while in the UK queue refers to that meaning. In the US, the word queue is most commonly used to refer to the computing sense of a data structure in which objects are added to one end and removed from the other. In the US, the equivalent terms to "queue up" and "wait in queue" are "line up" or "get in line" and "wait in line." The equivalent term to "jumping the queue" is "cutting in line."

Holiday greetings

It is increasingly common for Americans to say "Happy holidays", referring to all, or at least multiple, winter  (in the Northern hemisphere) or summer  (in the Southern hemisphere) holidays (Christmas, Hanukkah, Kwanzaa, etc.) especially when one's religious observances are not known; the phrase is rarely heard in the UK. In the UK, the phrases "holiday season" and "holiday period" refer to the period in the winter (in the Northern hemisphere) or summer (in the Southern hemisphere) when most people take time off from work, and travel; AmE does not use holiday in this sense, instead using vacation for recreational excursions.

In AmE, the prevailing Christmas greeting is "Merry Christmas", which is the traditional English Christmas greeting, as found in the English Christmas carol "We Wish You a Merry Christmas", and which appears several times in Charles Dickens' A Christmas Carol. In BrE, "Happy Christmas" is a common alternative to "Merry Christmas".

Idiosyncratic differences

Omission of "and" and "on"

Generally in British English, numbers with a value over one hundred have the word "and" inserted before the last two digits. For example, the number 115, when written in words or spoken aloud, would be "One hundred and fifteen", in British English. In American English, numbers are typically said or written in words in the same way, however if the word "and" is omitted ("One hundred fifteen"), this is also considered acceptable (in BrE this would be considered grammatically incorrect).

Likewise, in the US, the word "on" can be left out when referring to events occurring on any particular day of the week. The US possibility "The Cowboys won the game Saturday" would have the equivalent in the UK of "Sheffield United won the match on Saturday."

Figures of speech
Both BrE and AmE use the expression "I couldn't care less", to mean that the speaker does not care at all. Some Americans use "I could care less" to mean the same thing. This variant is frequently derided as sloppy, as the literal meaning of the words is that the speaker does care to some extent.

In both areas, saying, "I don't mind" often means, "I'm not annoyed" (for example, by someone's smoking), while "I don't care" often means, "The matter is trivial or boring". However, in answering a question such as "Tea or coffee?", if either alternative is equally acceptable an American may answer, "I don't care", while a British person may answer, "I don't mind". Either can sound odd, confusing, or rude, to those accustomed to the other variant.

"To be all set in both BrE and AmE can mean "to be prepared or ready", though it appears to be more common in AmE. It can also have an additional meaning in AmE of "to be finished or done", for example, a customer at a restaurant telling a waiter "I'm all set. I'll take the check."

Equivalent idioms
A number of English idioms that have essentially the same meaning show lexical differences between the British and the American version; for instance:

 In the US, a "carpet" typically refers to a fitted carpet, rather than a rug.

Social and cultural differences

Lexical items that reflect separate social and cultural development.

Education

Primary and secondary school

	

The US has a more uniform nationwide system of terms than does the UK, where terminology and structure varies among constituent countries, but the division by grades varies somewhat among the states and even among local school districts. For example, elementary school often includes kindergarten and may include sixth grade, with middle school including only two grades or extending to ninth grade.	

In the UK, the US equivalent of a high school is often referred to as a "secondary school" regardless of whether it is state funded or private. US Secondary education also includes middle school or junior high school, a two- or three-year transitional school between elementary school and high school. "Middle school" is sometimes used in the UK as a synonym for the younger junior school, covering the second half of the primary curriculum, current years four to six in some areas. However, in Dorset (South England), it is used to describe the second school in the three-tier system, which is normally from year 5 to year 8. In other regions, such as Evesham and the surrounding area in Worcestershire, the second tier goes from year 6 to year 8, and both starting secondary school in year nine. In Kirklees, West Yorkshire, in the villages of the Dearne Valley there is a three tier system: first schools year reception to year five, middle school (Scissett/Kirkburton Middle School) year 6 to year 8, and high school year 9 to year 13.

A public school has opposite meanings in the two countries. In American English this is a government-owned institution open to all students, supported by public funding. The British English use of the term is in the context of "private" education: to be educated privately with a tutor. In England and Wales the term strictly refers to an ill-defined group of prestigious private independent schools funded by students' fees, although it is often more loosely used to refer to any independent school. Independent schools are also known as "private schools", and the latter is the term used in Scotland and Northern Ireland for all such fee-funded schools. Strictly, the term public school is not used in Scotland and Northern Ireland in the same sense as in England, but nevertheless Gordonstoun, the Scottish private school, is sometimes referred to as a public school, as are some other Scottish private schools. Government-funded schools in Scotland and Northern Ireland are properly referred to as "state schools" but are sometimes confusingly referred to as "public schools" (with the same meaning as in the US), and in the US, where most public schools are administered by local governments, a state school typically refers to a college or university run by one of the U.S. states.	

Speakers in both the United States and the United Kingdom use several additional terms for specific types of secondary school. A US prep school or preparatory school is an independent school funded by tuition fees; the same term is used in the UK for a private school for pupils under 13, designed to prepare them for fee-paying public schools. In the US, Catholic schools cover costs through tuition and have affiliations with a religious institution, most often a Catholic church or diocese. In England, where the state-funded education system grew from parish schools organised by the local established church, the Church of England (C of E, or CE), and many schools, especially primary schools (up to age 11) retain a church connection and are known as church schools, CE schools or CE (aided) schools. There are also faith schools associated with the Roman Catholic Church and other major faiths, with a mixture of funding arrangements.	In Scotland, Catholic schools are generally operated as government-funded state schools for Catholic communities, particularly in large cities such as Glasgow.

In the US, a magnet school receives government funding and has special admission requirements: in some cases pupils gain admission through superior performance on admission tests, while other magnet schools admit students through a lottery. The UK has city academies, which are independent privately sponsored schools run with public funding and which can select up to 10% of pupils by aptitude. Moreover, in the UK 36 local education authorities retain selection by ability at 11. They maintain grammar schools (state funded secondary schools), which admit pupils according to performance in an examination (known as the 11+) and comprehensive schools that take pupils of all abilities. Grammar schools select the most academically able 10% to 23% of those who sit the exam. Students who fail the exam go to a secondary modern school, sometimes called a "high school", or increasingly an "academy". In areas where there are no grammar schools the comprehensives likewise may term themselves high schools or academies. Nationally only 6% of pupils attend grammar schools, mainly in four distinct counties. Some private schools are called "grammar schools", chiefly those that were grammar schools long before the advent of state education.

University
In the UK a university student is said to "study", to "read" or, informally, simply to "do" a subject. In the recent past the expression 'to read a subject' was more common at the older universities such as Oxford and Cambridge. In the US a student studies or majors in a subject (although a student's major, concentration or, less commonly, emphasis is also used in US colleges or universities to refer to the major subject of study). To major in something refers to the student's principal course of study; to study may refer to any class being taken.	

BrE:	

	

AmE:	

	

At university level in BrE, each module is taught or facilitated by a lecturer or tutor; professor is the job-title of a senior academic (in AmE, at some universities, the equivalent of the BrE lecturer is instructor, especially when the teacher has a lesser degree or no university degree, though the usage may become confusing according to whether the subject being taught is considered technical or not; it is also different from adjunct instructor/professor). In AmE each class is generally taught by a professor (although some US tertiary educational institutions follow the BrE usage), while the position of lecturer is occasionally given to individuals hired on a temporary basis to teach one or more classes and who may or may not have a doctoral degree.	

The word course in American use typically refers to the study of a restricted topic or individual subject (for example, "a course in Early Medieval England", "a course in integral calculus") over a limited period of time (such as a semester or term) and is equivalent to a module or sometimes unit at a British university. In the UK, a course of study or simply course is likely to refer to the entire programme of study, which may extend over several years and be made up of any number of modules, hence it is also practically synonymous to a degree programme. A few university-specific exceptions exist: for example, at Cambridge the word paper is used to refer to a module, while the whole course of study is called tripos.	

A dissertation in AmE refers to the final written product of a doctoral student to fulfil the requirement of that program.  In BrE, the same word refers to the final written product of a student in an undergraduate or taught master's programme.  A dissertation in the AmE sense would be a thesis in BrE, though dissertation is also used.	

Another source of confusion is the different usage of the word college. (See a full international discussion of the various meanings at college.) In the US, it refers to a post-high school institution that grants either associate's or bachelor's degrees, and in the UK, it refers to any post-secondary institution that is not a university (including sixth form college after the name in secondary education for years 12 and 13, the sixth form) where intermediary courses such as A levels or NVQs can be taken and GCSE courses can be retaken. College may sometimes be used in the UK or in Commonwealth countries as part of the name of a secondary or high school (for example, Dubai College). In the case of Oxford, Cambridge, Aberdeen, London, Lancaster, Durham, Kent and York universities, all members are also members of a college which is part of the university, for example, one is a member of King's College, Cambridge and hence of the university.	

In both the US and UK college can refer to some division within a university that comprises related academic departments such as the "college of business and economics" though in the UK "faculty" is more often used. Institutions in the US that offer two to four years of post-high school education often have the word college as part of their name, while those offering more advanced degrees are called a university. (There are exceptions: Boston College, Dartmouth College and the College of William & Mary are examples of colleges that offer advanced degrees, while Vincennes University is an unusual example of a "university" that offers only associate degrees in the vast majority of its academic programs.) American students who pursue a bachelor's degree (four years of higher education) or an associate degree (two years of higher education) are college students regardless of whether they attend a college or a university and refer to their educational institutions informally as colleges. A student who pursues a master's degree or a doctorate degree in the arts and sciences is in AmE a graduate student; in BrE a postgraduate student although graduate student is also sometimes used. Students of advanced professional programs are known by their field (business student, law student, medical student). Some universities also have a residential college system, the details of which may vary but generally involve common living and dining spaces as well as college-organised activities. Nonetheless, when it comes to the level of education, AmE generally uses the word college (e.g., going to college) whereas BrE generally uses the word university (e.g., going to university) regardless of the institution's official designation/status in both countries.	

In the context of higher education, the word school is used slightly differently in BrE and AmE.  In BrE, except for the University of London, the word school is used to refer to an academic department in a university. In AmE, the word school is used to refer to a collection of related academic departments and is headed by a dean. When it refers to a division of a university, school is practically synonymous to a college.	

"Professor" has different meanings in BrE and AmE. In BrE it is the highest academic rank, followed by reader, senior lecturer and lecturer. In AmE "professor" refers to academic staff of all ranks, with (full) professor (largely equivalent to the UK meaning) followed by associate professor and assistant professor.	

"Tuition" has traditionally had separate meaning in each variation. In BrE it is the educational content transferred from teacher to student at a university. In AmE it is the money (the fees) paid to receive that education (BrE: tuition fees).

General terms
In both the US and the UK, a student takes an exam, but in BrE a student can also be said to sit an exam. When preparing for an exam students revise (BrE)/review (AmE) what they have studied; the BrE idiom to revise for has the equivalent to review for in AmE.	

Examinations are supervised by invigilators in the UK and proctors (or (exam) supervisors) in the US (a proctor in the UK is an official responsible for student discipline at the University of Oxford or Cambridge). In the UK a teacher first sets and then administers exam, while in the US, a teacher first writes, makes, prepares, etc. and then gives an exam. With the same basic meaning of the latter idea but with a more formal or official connotation, a teacher in the US may also administer or proctor an exam.	

BrE:	

	

AmE:	

	

In BrE, students are awarded marks as credit for requirements (e.g., tests, projects) while in AmE, students are awarded points or "grades" for the same. Similarly, in BrE, a candidate's work is being marked, while in AmE it is said to be graded to determine what mark or grade is given.	

There is additionally a difference between American and British usage in the word school. In British usage "school" by itself refers only to primary (elementary) and secondary (high) schools and to sixth forms attached to secondary schools—if one "goes to school", this type of institution is implied. By contrast an American student at a university may be "in/at school", "coming/going to school", etc. US and British law students and medical students both commonly speak in terms of going to "law school" and "med[ical] school", respectively. However, the word school is used in BrE in the context of higher education to describe a division grouping together several related subjects within a university, for example a "School of European Languages" containing departments for each language and also in the term "art school". It is also the name of some of the constituent colleges of the University of London, for example, School of Oriental and African Studies, London School of Economics.	

Among high-school and college students in the United States, the words freshman (or the gender-neutral terms first year or sometimes freshie), sophomore, junior and senior refer to the first, second, third, and fourth years respectively. It is important that the context of either high school or college first be established or else it must be stated directly (that is, She is a high-school freshman. He is a college junior.). Many institutes in both countries also use the term first-year as a gender-neutral replacement for freshman, although in the US this is recent usage, formerly referring only to those in the first year as a graduate student. One exception is the University of Virginia; since its founding in 1819 the terms "first-year", "second-year", "third-year", and "fourth-year" have been used to describe undergraduate university students. At the United States service academies, at least those operated by the federal government directly, a different terminology is used, namely "fourth class", "third class", "second class" and "first class" (the order of numbering being the reverse of the number of years in attendance). In the UK first-year university students are sometimes called freshers early in the academic year; however, there are no specific names for those in other years nor for school pupils. Graduate and professional students in the United States are known by their year of study, such as a "second-year medical student" or a "fifth-year doctoral candidate." Law students are often referred to as "1L", "2L", or "3L" rather than "nth-year law students"; similarly, medical students are frequently referred to as "M1", "M2", "M3", or "M4".	

While anyone in the US who finishes studying at any educational institution by passing relevant examinations is said to graduate and to be a graduate, in the UK only degree and above level students can graduate. Student itself has a wider meaning in AmE, meaning any person of any age studying any subject at any level (including those not doing so at an educational institution, such as a "piano student" taking private lessons in a home), whereas in BrE it tends to be used for people studying at a post-secondary educational institution and the term pupil is more widely used for a young person at primary or secondary school, though the use of "student" for secondary school pupils in the UK is increasingly used, particularly for "sixth form" (years 12 and 13).	

The names of individual institutions can be confusing. There are several high schools with the word "university" in their names in the United States that are not affiliated with any post-secondary institutions and cannot grant degrees, and there is one public high school, Central High School of Philadelphia, that does grant bachelor's degrees to the top ten per cent of graduating seniors. British secondary schools occasionally have the word "college" in their names.	

When it comes to the admissions process, applicants are usually asked to solicit letters of reference or reference forms from referees in BrE. In AmE, these are called letters of recommendation or recommendation forms. Consequently, the writers of these letters are known as referees and recommenders, respectively by country. In AmE, the word referee is nearly always understood to refer to an umpire of a sporting match.	

In the context of education, for AmE, the word staff mainly refers to school personnel who are neither administrators nor have teaching loads or academic responsibilities; personnel who have academic responsibilities are referred to as members of their institution's faculty. In BrE, the word staff refers to both academic and non-academic school personnel. As mentioned previously, the term faculty in BrE refers more to a collection of related academic departments.

Government and politics
In the UK, political candidates stand for election, while in the US, they run for office. There is virtually no crossover between BrE and AmE in the use of these terms.  Also, the document which contains a party's positions/principles is referred to as a party platform in AmE, whereas it is commonly known as a party manifesto in BrE. (In AmE, using the term manifesto may connote that the party is an extremist or radical organisation.) The term general election is used slightly differently in British and American English. In BrE, it refers exclusively to a nationwide parliamentary election and is differentiated from local elections (mayoral and council) and by-elections; whereas in AmE, it refers to a final election for any government position in the US, where the term is differentiated from the term primary (an election that determines a party's candidate for the position in question). Additionally, a by-election in BrE is called a special election in AmE.

In AmE, the term swing state, swing county, swing district is used to denote a jurisdiction/constituency where results are expected to be close but crucial to the overall outcome of the general election. In BrE, the term marginal constituency is more often used for the same and swing is more commonly used to refer to how much one party has gained (or lost) an advantage over another compared to the previous election.	

In the UK, the term government only refers to what is commonly known in America as the executive branch or the particular administration.

A local government in the UK is generically referred to as the "council," whereas in the United States, a local government will be generically referred to as the "City" (or county, village, etc., depending on what kind of entity the government serves).

Business and finance
In financial statements, what is referred to in AmE as revenue or sales is known in BrE as turnover. In AmE, having "high turnover" in a business context would generally carry negative implications, though the precise meaning would differ by industry.	

A bankrupt firm goes into administration or liquidation in BrE; in AmE it goes bankrupt, or files for Chapter 7 (liquidation) or Chapter 11 (reorganisation). An insolvent individual or partnership goes bankrupt in both BrE and AmE.	

If a finance company takes possession of a mortgaged property from a debtor, it is called foreclosure in AmE and repossession in BrE. In some limited scenarios, repossession may be used in AmE, but it is much less commonly compared to foreclosure. One common exception in AmE is for automobiles, which are always said to be repossessed. Indeed, an agent who collects these cars for the bank is colloquially known in AmE as a repo man.

Employment and recruitment
In BrE, the term curriculum vitae (commonly abbreviated to CV) is used to describe the document prepared by applicants containing their credentials required for a job.  In AmE, the term résumé is more commonly used, with CV primarily used in academic or research contexts, and is usually more comprehensive than a résumé.

Insurance

AmE distinguishes between coverage as a noun and cover as a verb; an American seeks to buy enough insurance coverage in order to adequately cover a particular risk.  BrE uses the word "cover" for both the noun and verb forms.

Transport
AmE speakers refer to transportation and BrE speakers to transport. (Transportation in the UK has traditionally meant the punishment of criminals by deporting them to an overseas penal colony.) In AmE, the word transport is usually used only as a verb, seldom as a noun or adjective except in reference to certain specialised objects, such as a tape transport or a military transport (e.g., a troop transport, a kind of vehicle, not an act of transporting).

Road transport
Differences in terminology are especially obvious in the context of roads. The British term dual carriageway, in American parlance, would be divided highway or perhaps, simply highway. The central reservation on a motorway or dual carriageway in the UK would be the median or center divide on a freeway, expressway, highway or parkway in the US. The one-way lanes that make it possible to enter and leave such roads at an intermediate point without disrupting the flow of traffic are known as slip roads in the UK but in the US, they are typically known as ramps and both further distinguish between on-ramps or on-slips (for entering onto a highway/carriageway) and off-ramps or exit-slips (for leaving a highway/carriageway). When American engineers speak of slip roads, they are referring to a street that runs alongside the main road (separated by a berm) to allow off-the-highway access to the premises that are there; however, the term frontage road is more commonly used, as this term is the equivalent of service road in the UK. However, it is not uncommon for an American to use service road as well instead of frontage road.

In the UK, the term outside lane refers to the higher-speed overtaking lane (passing lane in the US) closest to the centre of the road, while inside lane refers to the lane closer to the edge of the road. In the US, outside lane is used only in the context of a turn, in which case it depends in which direction the road is turning (i.e., if the road bends right, the left lane is the "outside lane", but if the road bends left, it is the right lane). Both also refer to slow and fast lanes (even though all actual traffic speeds may be at or around the legal speed limit).	

In the UK drink driving refers to driving after having consumed alcoholic beverages, while in the US, the term is drunk driving. The legal term in the US is driving while intoxicated (DWI) or driving under the influence (of alcohol) (DUI). The equivalent legal phrase in the UK is drunk in charge of a motor vehicle (DIC) or more commonly driving with excess alcohol.	

In the UK, a hire car is the US equivalent of a rental car. The term "hired car" can be especially misleading for those in the US, where the term "hire" is generally only applied to the employment of people and the term "rent" is applied to the temporary custody of goods. To an American, "hired car" would imply that the car has been brought into the employment of an organisation as if it were a person, which would sound nonsensical.	

In the UK, a saloon is a vehicle that is equivalent to the American sedan. This is particularly confusing to Americans, because in the US the term saloon is used in only one context: describing an old bar (UK pub) in the American West (a Western saloon). Coupé is used by both to refer to a two-door car, but is usually pronounced with two syllables in the UK (coo-pay) and one syllable in the US (coop).	

In the UK, van may refer to a lorry (UK) of any size, whereas in the US, van is only understood to be a very small, boxy truck (US) (such as a moving van) or a long passenger automobile with several rows of seats (such as a minivan). A large, long vehicle used for cargo transport would nearly always be called a truck in the US, though alternate terms such as eighteen-wheeler may be occasionally heard (regardless of the actual number of tires on the truck).	

In the UK, a silencer is the equivalent to the US muffler. In the US, the word silencer has only one meaning: an attachment on the barrel of a gun designed to stop the distinctive crack of a gunshot.	

Specific auto parts and transport terms have different names in the two dialects, for example:

Rail transport

	

There are also differences in terminology in the context of rail transport. The best known is railway in the UK and railroad in North America, but there are several others. A railway station in the UK is a railroad station in the US, while train station is used in both; trains have drivers (often called engine drivers) in the UK, while in America trains are driven by engineers; trains have guards in the UK and  conductors in the US, though the latter is also common in the UK; a place where two tracks meet is called a set of  points in the UK and a switch in the US; and a place where a road crosses a railway line at ground level is called a level crossing in the UK and a grade crossing or railroad crossing in America. In the UK, the term sleeper is used for the devices that bear the weight of the rails and are known as ties or crossties in the United States. In a rail context, sleeper (more often, sleeper car) would be understood in the US as a rail car with sleeping quarters for its passengers. The British term platform in the sense "The train is at Platform 1" would be known in the US by the term track, and used in the phrase "The train is on Track 1". The British term brake van or guard's van is a caboose in the US. The American English phrase "All aboard" when boarding a train is rarely used in the UK, and when the train reaches its final stop, in the UK the phrase used by rail personnel is "All change" while in the US it is "All out", though such announcements are uncommon in both regions.

For sub-surface rail networks, while underground is commonly used in the UK, only the London Underground actually carries this name: the UK's only other such system, the smaller Glasgow Subway, was in fact the first to be called "subway". Nevertheless, both subway and metro are now more common in the US, varying by city: in Washington D.C., for example, metro is used, while in New York City subway is preferred. Another variation is the T in Boston.

Television

Traditionally, a show on British television would have referred to a light-entertainment program (BrE programme) with one or more performers and a participative audience, whereas in American television, the term is used for any type of program. British English traditionally referred to other types of program by their type, such as drama, serial etc., but the term show has now taken on the generalised American meaning. In American television the episodes of a program first broadcast in a particular year constitute a season, while the entire run of the program—which may span several seasons—is called a series. In British television, on the other hand, the word series may apply to the episodes of a program in one particular year, for example, "The 1998 series of Grange Hill, as well as to the entire run. However, the entire run may occasionally be referred to as a "show".
The term telecast, meaning television broadcast and uncommon even in the US, is not used in British English. A television program would be broadcast, aired or shown in both the UK and US.

Telecommunications

A long-distance call is a "trunk call" in British English, but is a "toll call" in American English, though neither term is well known among younger Americans. The distinction is a result of historical differences in the way local service was billed; the Bell System traditionally flat-rated local calls in all but a few markets, subsidising local service by charging higher rates, or tolls, for intercity calls, allowing local calls to appear to be free. British Telecom (and the British Post Office before it) charged for all calls, local and long distance, so labelling one class of call as "toll" would have been meaningless.	

Similarly, a toll-free number in America is a freephone number in the UK. The term "freefone" is a BT trademark.

Rivers 
In British English, the name of a river is placed after the word (River Thames). In American English, the name is placed before the word (Hudson River).

Style

Use of that and which in restrictive and non-restrictive relative clauses

Generally, a non-restrictive relative clause (also called non-defining or supplementary) is one containing information that is supplementary, i.e. does not change the meaning of the rest of the sentence, while a restrictive relative clause (also called defining or integrated) contains information essential to the meaning of the sentence, effectively limiting the modified noun phrase to a subset that is defined by the relative clause.
An example of a restrictive clause is "The dog that bit the man was brown."
An example of a non-restrictive clause is "The dog, which bit the man, was brown."
In the former, "that bit the man" identifies which dog the statement is about.
In the latter, "which bit the man" provides supplementary information about a known dog.
A non-restrictive relative clause is typically set off by commas, whereas a restrictive relative clause is not, but this is not a rule that is universally observed. In speech, this is also reflected in the intonation.
Writers commonly use which to introduce a non-restrictive clause, and that to introduce a restrictive clause. That is rarely used to introduce a non-restrictive relative clause in prose. Which and that are both commonly used to introduce a restrictive clause; a study in 1977 reported that about 75 per cent of occurrences of which were in restrictive clauses.

H. W. Fowler, in A Dictionary of Modern English Usage of 1926, followed others in suggesting that it would be preferable to use which as the non-restrictive (what he calls "non-defining") pronoun and that as the restrictive (what he calls defining) pronoun, but he also stated that this rule was observed neither by most writers nor by the best writers. 
He implied that his suggested usage was more common in American English.
Fowler notes that his recommended usage presents problems, in particular that that must be the first word of the clause, which means, for instance, that which cannot be replaced by that when it immediately follows a preposition (e.g. "the basic unit from which matter is constructed")  –  though this would not prevent a stranded preposition (e.g. "the basic unit that matter is constructed from).

Style guides by American prescriptivists, such as Bryan Garner, typically insist, for stylistic reasons, that that be used for restrictive relative clauses and which be used for non-restrictive clauses, referring to the use of which in restrictive clauses as a "mistake". According to the 2015 edition of Fowler's Dictionary of Modern English Usage, "In AmE which is 'not generally used in restrictive clauses, and that fact is then interpreted as the absolute rule that only that may introduce a restrictive clause', whereas in BrE 'either that or which may be used in restrictive clauses', but many British people 'believe that that is obligatory'".

Subjunctive

The subjunctive mood is commoner in colloquial American English than in colloquial British English.

Writing

Spelling

Before the early 18th century English spelling was not standardised. Different standards became noticeable after the publishing of influential dictionaries. For the most part current BrE spellings follow those of Samuel Johnson's Dictionary of the English Language (1755), while AmE spellings follow those of Noah Webster's An American Dictionary of the English Language (1828). In the United Kingdom, the influences of those who preferred the French spellings of certain words proved decisive. In many cases AmE spelling deviated from mainstream British spelling; on the other hand it has also often retained older forms. Many of the now characteristic AmE spellings were popularised, although often not created, by Noah Webster. Webster chose already-existing alternative spellings "on such grounds as simplicity, analogy or etymology". Webster did attempt to introduce some reformed spellings, as did the Simplified Spelling Board in the early 20th century, but most were not adopted. Later spelling changes in the UK had little effect on present-day US spelling, and vice versa.

Punctuation

Full stops and periods in abbreviations
There have been some trends of transatlantic difference in use of periods in some abbreviations. These are discussed at Abbreviation § Periods (full stops) and spaces. Unit symbols such as kg and Hz are never punctuated.

Parentheses/brackets
In British English, "( )" marks are often referred to as brackets, whereas "[ ]" are called square brackets and "{ }" are called curly brackets. In formal British English and in American English "( )" marks are parentheses (singular: parenthesis), "[ ]" are called brackets or square brackets, and "{ }" can be called either curly brackets or braces. Despite the different names, these marks are used in the same way in both varieties.

Quoting

British and American English differ in the preferred quotation mark style, including the placement of commas and periods. In American English, " and ' are called quotation marks, whereas in British English, " and ' are referred to as either inverted commas or speech marks. Additionally, in American English direct speech typically uses the double quote mark ( " ), whereas in British English it is common to use the inverted comma ( ' ).

Commas in headlines
American newspapers commonly use a comma as a shorthand for "and" in headlines. For example, The Washington Post had the headline "A TRUE CONSERVATIVE: For McCain, Bush Has Both Praise, Advice."

Numerical expressions

There are many differences in the writing and speaking of English numerals, most of which are matters of style, with the notable exception of different definitions for billion.

The two countries have different conventions for floor numbering.  The UK uses a mixture of the metric system and Imperial units, where in the US, United States customary units are dominant in everyday life with a few fields using the metric system.

Monetary amounts
Monetary amounts in the range of one to two major currency units are often spoken differently. In AmE one may say a dollar fifty or a pound eighty, whereas in BrE these amounts would be expressed one dollar fifty and one pound eighty. For amounts over a dollar an American will generally either drop denominations or give both dollars and cents, as in two-twenty or two dollars and twenty cents for $2.20. An American would not say two dollars twenty. On the other hand, in BrE, two-twenty or two pounds twenty would be most common.

It is more common to hear a British-English speaker say one thousand two hundred dollars than a thousand and two hundred dollars, although the latter construct is common in AmE. In British English, the "and" comes after the hundreds (one thousand, two hundred and thirty dollars). The term twelve hundred dollars, popular in AmE, is frequently used in BrE but only for exact multiples of 100 up to 1,900. Speakers of BrE very rarely hear amounts over 1,900 expressed in hundreds, for example, twenty-three hundred. In AmE it would not be unusual to refer to a high, uneven figure such as 2,307 as twenty-three hundred and seven.
	 
In BrE, particularly in television or radio advertisements, integers can be pronounced individually in the expression of amounts. For example, on sale for £399 might be expressed on sale for three nine nine, though the full three hundred and ninety-nine pounds is at least as common. An American advertiser would almost always say on sale for three ninety-nine, with context distinguishing $399 from $3.99. In British English the latter pronunciation implies a value in pounds and pence, so three ninety-nine would be understood as £3.99.
	
In spoken BrE the word pound is sometimes colloquially used for the plural as well. For example, three pound forty and twenty pound a week are both heard in British English. Some other currencies do not change in the plural; yen and rand being examples. This is in addition to normal adjectival use, as in a twenty-pound-a-week pay-rise (US raise). The euro most often takes a regular plural -s in practice despite the EU dictum that it should remain invariable in formal contexts; the invariable usage is more common in Ireland, where it is the official currency.
	 
In BrE the use of p instead of pence is common in spoken usage. Each of the following has equal legitimacy: 3 pounds 12 p; 3 pounds and 12 p; 3 pounds 12 pence; 3 pounds and 12 pence; as well as just 8 p or 8 pence. In everyday usage the amount is simply read as figures (£3.50 = three pounds fifty) as in AmE.
	 
AmE uses words such as nickel, dime, and quarter for small coins. In BrE the usual usage is a 10-pence piece or a 10p piece or simply a 10p, for any coin below £1, pound coin and two-pound coin. BrE did have specific words for a number of coins before decimalisation. Formal coin names such as half crown (2/6) and florin (2/-), as well as slang or familiar names such as bob (1/-) and tanner (6d) for pre-decimalisation coins are still familiar to older BrE speakers but they are not used for modern coins. In older terms like two-bob bit (2/-) and thrupenny bit (3d), the word bit had common usage before decimalisation similar to that of piece today.

On a cheque UK residents would write three pounds and 24 pence, three pounds ‒ 24, or three pounds ‒ 24p since the currency unit is not preprinted.

Dates

Dates are usually written differently in the short (numerical) form. Christmas Day 2000, for example, is 25/12/00 or 25.12.00 in the UK and 12/25/00 in the US, although the formats 25/12/2000, 25.12.2000, and 12/25/2000 now have more currency than they had before Y2K. Occasionally other formats are encountered, such as the ISO 8601 2000-12-25, popular among programmers, scientists and others seeking to avoid ambiguity, and to make alphanumerical order coincide with chronological order. The difference in short-form date order can lead to misunderstanding, especially when using software or equipment that uses the foreign format. For example, 06/04/05 could mean either June 4, 2005 (if read as US format), 6 April 2005 (if seen as in UK format) or even 5 April 2006 if taken to be an older ISO 8601-style format where 2-digit years were allowed.
	 
When using the name of the month rather than the number to write a date in the UK, the recent standard style is for the day to precede the month, e. g., 21 April. Month preceding date is almost invariably the style in the US, and was common in the UK until the late twentieth century. British usage normally changes the day from an integer to an ordinal, i.e., 21st instead of 21. In speech, "of" and "the" are used in the UK, as in "the 21st of April". In written language, the words "the" and "of" may be and are usually dropped, i.e., 21st April. The US would say this as "April 21st", and this form is still common in the UK. One of the few exceptions in American English is saying "the Fourth of July" as a shorthand for the United States Independence Day. In the US military the British forms are used, but the day is read cardinally, while among some speakers of New England and Southern American English varieties and who come from those regions but live elsewhere, those forms are common, even in formal contexts.
	 
Phrases such as the following are common in the UK but are generally unknown in the US: "A week today", "a week tomorrow", "a week (on) Tuesday" and "Tuesday week"; these all refer to a day which is more than a week into the future. "A fortnight Friday" and "Friday fortnight" refer to a day two weeks after the coming Friday). "A week on Tuesday" and "a fortnight on Friday" could refer either to a day in the past ("it's a week on Tuesday, you need to get another one") or in the future ("see you a week on Tuesday"), depending on context. In the US the standard construction is "a week from today", "a week from tomorrow", etc. BrE speakers may also say "Thursday last" or "Thursday gone" where AmE would prefer "last Thursday". "I'll see you (on) Thursday coming" or "let's meet this coming Thursday" in BrE refer to a meeting later this week, while "not until Thursday next" would refer to next week. In BrE there is also common use of the term 'Thursday after next' or 'week after next' meaning 2 weeks in the future and 'Thursday before last' and 'week before last' meaning 2 weeks in the past, but not when referring to times more than 2 weeks been or gone or when using the terms tomorrow today or yesterday then in BrE you would say '5 weeks on Tuesday' or '2 weeks yesterday'.

Time

The 24-hour clock (18:00, 18.00 or 1800) is considered normal in the UK and Europe in many applications including air, rail and bus timetables; it is largely unused in the US outside military, police, aviation and medical applications. As a result, many Americans refer to the 24-hour clock as military time. Some British English style guides recommend the full stop (.) when telling time, compared to American English which uses colons (i.e., 11:15 PM/pm/p.m. or 23:15 for AmE and 11.15 pm or 23.15 for BrE). Usually in the military (and sometimes in the police, aviation and medical) applications on both sides of the Atlantic 0800 and 1800 are read as (oh/zero) eight hundred and eighteen hundred hours respectively. Even in the UK, hundred follows twenty, twenty-one, twenty-two and twenty-three when reading 2000, 2100, 2200 and 2300 according to those applications.
	 
Fifteen minutes after the hour is called quarter past in British usage and a quarter after or, less commonly, a quarter past in American usage. Fifteen minutes before the hour is usually called quarter to in British usage and a quarter of, a quarter to or a quarter 'til in American usage; the form a quarter to is associated with parts of the Northern United States, while a quarter 'til or till is found chiefly in the Appalachian region. Thirty minutes after the hour is commonly called half past in both BrE and AmE; half after used to be more common in the US. In informal British speech, the preposition is sometimes omitted, so that 5:30 may be referred to as half five; this construction is entirely foreign to US speakers, who would possibly interpret half five as 4:30 (halfway to 5:00) rather than 5:30. The AmE formations top of the hour and bottom of the hour are not used in BrE. Forms such as eleven forty are common in both varieties. To be simple and direct in telling time, no terms relating to fifteen or thirty minutes before/after the hour are used; rather the time is told exactly as for example nine fifteen, ten forty-five.

Sports percentages
In sports statistics, certain percentages such as those for winning or win–loss records and saves in field or ice hockey and association football are almost always expressed as a decimal proportion to three places in AmE and are usually read aloud as if they are whole numbers, e.g. (0).500 or five hundred, hence the phrase "games/matches over five hundred", whereas in BrE they are also expressed but as true percentages instead, after multiplying the decimal by 100%, that is, 50% or "fifty per cent" and "games/matches over 50% or 50 per cent". However, "games/matches over 50% or 50 percent" is also found in AmE, albeit sporadically, e.g., hitting percentages in volleyball.

The American practice of expressing so-called percentages in sports statistics as decimals originated with baseball's batting averages, developed by English-born statistician and historian Henry Chadwick.

See also

 American and British English grammatical differences
 American and British English pronunciation differences
 American and British English spelling differences
 British and American keyboards
 List of dialects of the English language
 Lists of words having different meanings in American and British English

Explanatory notes

Citations

General and cited sources 
 Algeo, John (2006). British or American English?. Cambridge: Cambridge University Press. .
 Hargraves, Orin (2003). Mighty Fine Words and Smashing Expressions. Oxford: Oxford University Press. .
 McArthur, Tom (2002). The Oxford Guide to World English. Oxford: Oxford University Press. .
 Murphy, Lynne (2018). The Prodigal Tongue: The Love-Hate Relationship Between British and American English. London. Oneworld Publications.  .
 Peters, Pam (2004). The Cambridge Guide to English Usage. Cambridge: Cambridge University Press. .
 Trudgill, Peter and Jean Hannah (2002). International English: A Guide to the Varieties of Standard English, 4th ed. London: Arnold. .

Further reading

External links
 Word substitution list, by the Ubuntu English (United Kingdom) Translators team
 Linguistics Issues List of American, Canadian and British spelling differences
 Map of US English dialects
 The Septic's Companion: A British Slang Dictionary
 
 British English vs. American English Slang Compared
 British English-American English Vocabulary Quiz

 
Language comparison between countries
Comparison of forms of English
Internationalization and localization
United Kingdom–United States relations